Ammo Baba Stadium, previously known as Al Rusafa Stadium, is a football stadium that is currently under construction in Baghdad, Iraq. It will have a capacity of 31,200 spectators and will cost approximately 100 million USD funded entirely by Iraqi government.

In early 2017, the stadium was renamed after Ammo Baba, a famous Iraqi player and manager of the 20th century.

Design
The project involves the construction of a stadium covering an area of 41,500 m² and a built-up area of 17,000 m² with 31,200 seats for the main stadium, including two training pitches with a capacity of 2,000 spectators and 500 spectators respectively. Other related facilities are planned, including a 4-star hotel and 2,900 parking places.

See also
List of football stadiums in Iraq

References

Football venues in Iraq
Stadiums under construction